Son of France (French: Fils de France) is a 1946 French drama film directed by Pierre Blondy and starring Jean Mercanton, Jimmy Gaillard and Jacques Famery. It was made with the assistance of the French Army Film Service.

Cast
 Jean Mercanton as Hans  
 Jimmy Gaillard as Yves  
 Jacques Famery as François  
 Émile Genevois as Marcel  
 Jean Daurand as Le maréchal des logis Gobert  
 Ginette Baudin as Gretel  
 Jean Gaven as Le lieutenant Brévannes  
 Lucien Blondeau as Le colonel  
 Louis Florencie as Le commandant  
 Raymone 
 Odette Barencey as Mme Chatin 
 Lise Bravo 
 Georges Sauval
 Gérard Blain   
 Luce Fabiole

References

Bibliography 
 Henry Rousso & Arthur Goldhammer. The Vichy syndrome: history and memory in France since 1944. Harvard University Press, 1994.

External links 
 

1946 films
1946 drama films
French drama films
1940s French-language films
French black-and-white films
1940s French films